Cottonvale is a locality in the Southern Downs Region, Queensland, Australia. It borders New South Wales. It contains the town of Cotton Vale.

Geography 
The South Western railway line enters the locality from the north-east (Dalveen) and exits to the south (Thulimbah).

The New England Highway also traverses the locality from the north-east (Dalveen) to the south-east (Thulimbah), always remaining east of the railway line and bypassing the town.

History 
After World War I, the area was opened up as a soldier settlement focused on fruit growing. The town was named after the Cotton Vale railway station, which was in turn named in 1920 by the Queensland Railways Department after orchardist Edward Cotton, who was believed to be the first from his district to enlist as a soldier in World War I.

Cottonvale Provisional School opened in the Cottonvale School of Arts Hall on 30 January 1958. On 28 May 1959 it became Cottonvale State School. It was mothballed on 31 December 2004 and closed on 24 August 2005. It was at 11 Cottonvale School Road.

Education 
There are no schools in Cottonvale. The nearest primary schools are in Thulimbah (almost on the boundary with Cottonvale) and in Dalveen. The nearest secondary schools are in Stanthorpe.

References 

Southern Downs Region
Localities in Queensland